Doi Saket is a district (amphoe) in the eastern part of Chiang Mai province in northern Thailand. The district is predominantly a rural farming area, containing a mixture of rice fields on the valley floor to orchard and other farming on the hillsides. The village is known for its murals inside Wat Doi Saket.

History
The district was established in 1902.

Geography
Neighboring districts are (from the south clockwise) Mae On, San Kamphaeng, San Sai, Mae Taeng, Phrao of Chiang Mai province, Wiang Pa Pao of Chiang Rai province and Mueang Pan of Lampang province.

The district is named after 1,816 m high Doi Saket (ดอยสะเก็ด), a mountain of the Khun Tan Range on the east side of the district.

Administration
The district is divided into 14 sub-districts (tambons), which are further subdivided into 110 villages (mubans). Doi Saket is a township (thesaban tambon), which covers parts of tambon Choeng Doi and Luang Nuea. There are a further 13 tambon administrative organizations (TAO).

External links
amphoe.com

Doi Saket